Marcia Simone "Cia" Price (born July 20, 1980) is an American politician of the Democratic Party. On November 3, 2015, she was elected to the Virginia House of Delegates, representing the 95th district, which includes parts of the cities of Hampton and Newport News.  She is the daughter of Newport News Mayor McKinley L. Price and the niece of Congressman Bobby Scott. She sponsored the Voting Rights Act of Virginia.

Electoral history

References

External links
Campaign website
Official House of Delegates website

 

Politicians from Hampton, Virginia
Politicians from Newport News, Virginia
African-American women in politics
1980 births
Living people
Spelman College alumni
Howard University alumni
Women state legislators in Virginia
Democratic Party members of the Virginia House of Delegates
21st-century American politicians
21st-century American women politicians